Ferenc András (born 24 November 1942) is a Hungarian film director and screenwriter. He has directed more than 20 films since 1970. His 1982 film Dögkeselyű was entered into the 33rd Berlin International Film Festival.

Selected filmography
 Dögkeselyű (1982)

References

External links

1942 births
Living people
Hungarian film directors
Hungarian screenwriters
Male screenwriters
Hungarian male writers
Writers from Budapest